Agathotoma apocrypha is a species of sea snail, a marine gastropod mollusc in the family Mangeliidae.

Distribution
This species occurs in the Caribbean Sea

References

 García E.F. 2008. Eight new molluscan species (Gastropoda: Turridae) from the western Atlantic, with description of two new genera. Novapex 9(1): 1-15
 Rolán E., Fernández-Garcés E. & Redfern C. (2012) New records and description of four new species of the genus Agathotoma (Gastropoda, Mangeliidae) in the Caribbean. Novapex 13(2): 45-62

apocrypha
Gastropods described in 2008